The Resort may refer to:

 The Resort (TV series), a mystery comedy series premiered in 2022
 The Resort (film), a 2021 horror film by Taylor Chien

See also 
 Resort (disambiguation)